Natrona is an unincorporated community in Pratt County, Kansas, United States.  It is located several miles northeast of Pratt.

History
Natrona briefly had a post office, from 1888 until 1890.

References

Further reading

External links
 Pratt County maps: Current, Historic, KDOT

Unincorporated communities in Pratt County, Kansas
Unincorporated communities in Kansas